Abdelhamid Sabiri (born 28 November 1996) is a Moroccan professional footballer who plays as a attacking midfielder for Italian  club Sampdoria on loan from Fiorentina, and the Morocco national team.

Sabiri has previously played for Sportfreunde Siegen, 1. FC Nürnberg, Huddersfield Town and SC Paderborn. Born in Morocco, he represented Germany at under-21 level, before switching allegiance to Morocco in 2022.

Early life
Sabiri was born in Morocco and moved to Germany at the age of three. There, he was raised in Frankfurt and holds dual citizenship of Germany and Morocco.
Sabiri comes from an Amazigh (Berber) family  originating from the city of Goulmima, Errachidia Province, Morocco.

Club career
After spending his youth career with TuS Koblenz and Darmstadt 98, he began his club career with Sportfreunde Siegen in the German fifth tier. After achieving 20 goals and six assists in 33 appearances in all competitions, he moved to 1. FC Nürnberg in 2016, initially playing for the club's second team. He was promoted to the first team in January 2017 and went on to score five times in nine 2. Bundesliga appearances towards the end of the season.

Huddersfield Town
Sabiri joined English club Huddersfield Town on 23 August 2017 on a three-year deal, for an undisclosed fee. The club had recently been promoted to the Premier League, the highest tier of English league football. He made his Premier League debut in a 2–0 loss away to West Ham on 11 September 2017. He made sporadic appearances for the Terriers, after suffering injuries, before his contract was terminated by mutual agreement on 27 August 2019.

SC Paderborn
On 27 August 2019, Sabiri joined SC Paderborn on a two-year deal, with the option of a third year.

Ascoli
On 28 September 2020, he joined Italian Serie B club Ascoli on a two-year contract.

Sampdoria
On 29 January 2022, he moved to Serie A club Sampdoria on loan with an option to buy and a conditional obligation to buy. Sabiri made his debut in a 2–0 loss against Atalanta B.C. He scored his first goal for the club against Spezia, in his seventh appearance for the team. On 30 January 2023, Italian sources confirmed talks between Sampadoria and Fiorentina to sign Sabiri for 4 million euros.

Fiorentina
On 31 January 2023, Sabiri signed with Fiorentina and was loaned back to Sampdoria for the rest of the 2022–23 season.

International career
Sabiri was called up to Germany's under-21 side in October 2018. He scored once in a total of five appearances for the team, against the Netherlands.

In April 2022, Sabiri said he wanted to play in the World Cup with the Moroccan national team. In September 2022, Sabiri was called up to join the Moroccan national team. He played his first match in a friendlies against Chile, in which he managed to score a goal in a 2–0 victory that took place in the RCDE Stadium in Barcelona.

On 10 November 2022, Sabiri was named in Morocco's 23-man squad for the 2022 FIFA World Cup in Qatar.

Playing style 
Sabiri mainly plays in the "number 10" position behind a central striker, but can also play in wide attacking areas.

Career statistics

Club

International

Scores and results list Morocco's goal tally first, score column indicates score after each Sabiri goal.

References

External links

1996 births
Living people
People from Drâa-Tafilalet
Moroccan footballers
Morocco international footballers
German footballers
Germany under-21 international footballers
German people of Moroccan descent
Association football midfielders
Moroccan expatriate footballers
German expatriate footballers
Naturalized citizens of Germany
Moroccan emigrants to Germany
Expatriate footballers in England
German expatriate sportspeople in England
Expatriate footballers in Italy
German expatriate sportspeople in Italy
Sportfreunde Siegen players
1. FC Nürnberg II players
1. FC Nürnberg players
Huddersfield Town A.F.C. players
SC Paderborn 07 players
Ascoli Calcio 1898 F.C. players
U.C. Sampdoria players
ACF Fiorentina players
2. Bundesliga players
Regionalliga players
Oberliga (football) players
Premier League players
Serie A players
Serie B players
2022 FIFA World Cup players
Bundesliga players